The David Gordon House and Collins Log Cabin were two historic homes located at Columbia, Missouri. The David Gordon House is a two-story, frame I-house.  The 13-room structure incorporated original construction from about 1823 and several additions from the 1830s, 1890s and 1930s.  The Collins Log Cabin was built in 1818, and is a single pen log house of the story and a loft design. They represent some of the first permanent dwellings in Columbia. The house, located in what is now Stephens Lake Park burned after arson in the early 1990s. The log cabin survived has been relocated from Stephens Lake Park to the campus of the Boone County Historical Society.

They were added to the National Register of Historic Places in 1983.

References

External links
 Boone County Historical Society

Houses in Columbia, Missouri
Log cabins in the United States
Houses completed in 1818
Houses completed in 1823
Houses on the National Register of Historic Places in Missouri
Log houses in the United States
Museums in Columbia, Missouri
Historic house museums in Missouri
Former buildings and structures in Columbia, Missouri
Relocated buildings and structures in Missouri
National Register of Historic Places in Boone County, Missouri
Log buildings and structures on the National Register of Historic Places in Missouri
African-American history in Columbia, Missouri